Garner Lake Provincial Park is a provincial park around Garner Lake in Alberta, Canada.

Garner Orchid Fen Natural Area is an extension of the park.

Activities
The following activities are available in the park:
Beach activities (swimming, volleyball, water-skiing and windsurfing)
Camping
Canoeing and kayaking
Cross-country skiing ( of non-groomed trails)
Fishing and ice fishing
Front country hiking
Mountain biking
Power boating
Sailing

See also
List of provincial parks in Alberta
List of Canadian provincial parks
List of National Parks of Canada

References

External links

Provincial parks of Alberta
Smoky Lake County